The Kirghiz rebellion occurred when Kyrgyz irregulars in Xinjiang revolted against the Republic of China in March 1932. The Kirghiz rebels, led by Id Mirab, revolted in the Tian Shan mountains as part of the wider Kumul Rebellion in Xinjiang, until they were quickly defeated by government forces led by Ma Shaowu, the Hui military commander of Kashgar, with some minor assistance of the Soviet Union.

References 

China–Soviet Union relations
Wars involving the Soviet Union
Conflicts in 1932
1932 in China
East Turkestan independence movement
Rebellions in Asia
Xinjiang Wars
Wars involving the Republic of China